Alexander Dmitrievich Zasyadko (1779 – ), was artillery engineer of the Russian Imperial Army, of Ukrainian origin, lieutenant general of artillery. Designer and specialist in missile weapons development.

In 1797, Zasyadko graduated from the Artillery and Engineering School in Saint Petersburg (currently Mozhaysky Military Engineering-Space University). 

In 1815, Zasyadko began his work on creating military gunpowder rockets. He constructed rocket-launching platforms, which allowed to fire in salvos (6 rockets at a time), and gun-laying devices. Zasyadko elaborated a tactics for military use of rocket weaponry. In 1820, Zasyadko was appointed head of the Petersburg Armory, Okhtensky Powder Factory, pyrotechnic laboratory and the first Higher Artillery School in Russia. In 1826, Zasyadyk was appointed chief of staff of the Russian artillery. In 1827, Zasyadko was in charge of Artillery Headquarters of the Russian army and took part in the Russo-Turkish War of 1828-1829, his rockets played important role during siege of Brăila and Varna.
He organized rocket production in a special rocket workshop and created the first rocket sub-unit in the Russian army.

In 1834, Zasyadko retired due to his illness. The crater Zasyadko on the far side of the Moon is named after him.

References

External links 
 http://www.space.hobby.ru/firsts/zasyadko.html

Russian military engineers
Russian inventors
19th-century engineers from the Russian Empire
Imperial Russian Army generals
1779 births
1837 deaths
Recipients of the Order of St. George of the Third Degree